Rudolf Löb (November 21, 1877 – January 30, 1966) was a German banker with Mendelssohn & Co. and consultant to the German and Russian governments.

Life
Löb became personal liable partner with Mendelssohn & Co. in 1919. Following the death of Franz von Mendelssohn and Paul von Mendelssohn-Bartholdy in 1935, Löb was appointed as chairman of Mendelssohn & Co. bank as the first non-family member. In the 1930s, he served as the Belgian General Consul in Berlin. In 1938 he was pressured by the Nazis' Aryanisation policy to break up Mendelssohn & Co. and hand over most of its assets to Deutsche Bank. Löb emigrated to Argentina in 1939 and to the United States in 1948. He died on January 30, 1966.

Further reading

External links
Guide to the Rudolph Loeb Collection at the Leo Baeck Institute, NY

1877 births
1966 deaths
German bankers
German emigrants to the United States
German emigrants to Argentina
Businesspeople from Wuppertal